The Journal of Computer-Mediated Communication JCMC is a quarterly open access peer-reviewed academic journal that covers the interdisciplinary field of computer-mediated communication. It was established in 1994 and is published by Oxford University Press on behalf of the International Communication Association.

According to the Journal Citation Reports, its 2018 impact factor was 4.896, ranking 1st out of 88 in the category "Communication" and 2nd out of 89 in the category "Information Science & Library Science".

Editors 
The following persons have been editor-in-chief of the journal:
 2018–present Richard Ling (Nanyang Technological University)
 2014–2017: Shyam Sundar (Pennsylvania State University)
 2011–2013: Maria Bakardjieva (University of Calgary)
 2008–2010: Kevin Wright (University of Oklahoma)
 2005–2007: Susan Herring (Indiana University)
 1994–2004: Founding Editors: Margaret McLaughlin (University of Southern California) and Sheizaf Rafaeli (Hebrew University of Jerusalem and University of Haifa)

External links
 

Computer science journals
Publications established in 1995
Quarterly journals
English-language journals
Communication journals
Educational technology journals
Oxford University Press academic journals